Irena Soukupová (9 December 1964 – 4 February 2020) was a Czech rower. She competed for Czechoslovakia at the 1988 Summer Olympics and the 1992 Summer Olympics.

References

External links
 
 

1964 births
2020 deaths
Czech female rowers
Olympic rowers of Czechoslovakia
Rowers at the 1988 Summer Olympics
Rowers at the 1992 Summer Olympics
Rowers from Prague